Jacob of Sarug (Yaʿquḇ Sruḡāyâ, ; his toponym is also spelled Serug or Serugh; ;  451 – 29 November 521), also called Mar Jacob, was one of the foremost Syriac poet-theologians, perhaps only second in stature to Ephrem the Syrian and equal to Narsai. Where his predecessor Ephrem is known as the 'Harp of the Spirit', Jacob is the 'Flute of the Spirit' in the Antiochene Syriac Christianity. He is best known for his prodigious corpus of more than seven-hundred verse homilies, or mêmrê, of which only 225 have thus far been edited and published.

Life
Jacob was born around the middle of the fifth century in the village of Kurtam on the Euphrates in the ancient region of Serugh, which stood as the eastern part of the province of Commagene (corresponding to the modern Kurdish districts of Suruç and Birecik). He was educated in the famous School of Edessa and became chorepiscopus back in the Serugh area, serving rural churches of Haura (Ḥaurâ). His tenure of this office extended over a time of great trouble to the Christian population of Mesopotamia, due to the fierce war carried on by the Sasanian emperor Kavadh I within the Roman borders. When, on 10 January 503, the city of Amida (now Diyarbakır) was captured by the Sasanians after a three-month siege and all its citizens put to the sword or carried captive, a panic seized the whole district, and the Christian inhabitants of many neighbouring cities planned to leave their homes and flee to the west of the Euphrates. They were recalled to a more courageous frame of mind by the letters of Jacob.

In 519, Jacob was elected bishop of the main city of the area, called in Syriac Baṭnān d-Sruḡ. As Jacob was born in the same year as the controversial Council of Chalcedon, he lived through the intense rifts that split Eastern Christianity, which led to most Syriac speakers being separated from Byzantine communion. Even though imperial persecution of anti-Chalcedonians became increasingly brutal towards the end of Jacob's life, he remained surprisingly quiet on such divisive theological and political issues. However, when pressed in correspondence by Paul, bishop of Edessa, he openly expressed dissatisfaction with the proceedings of Chalcedon.

From the various extant accounts of Jacob's life and from the number of his known works, we gather that his literary activity was unceasing. According to Bar Hebraeus (Chron. Eccles. i. 191) he employed 70 amanuenses and wrote in all 760 metrical homilies, besides expositions, letters and hymns of different sorts. Of his merits as a writer and poet we are now well able to judge from Paul Bedjan's edition of selected metrical homilies (Paris 1905–1908), containing 146 pieces. They are written throughout in dodecasyllabic metre, and those published deal mainly with biblical themes, though there are also poems on such subjects as the deaths of Christian martyrs, the fall of the idols and the First Council of Nicaea.

Of Jacob's prose works, which are not nearly so numerous, the most interesting are his letters, which throw light upon some of the events of his time and reveal his attachment to Miaphysitism, which was then struggling for supremacy in the Syrian churches, and particularly at Edessa, over the opposite teaching of Nestorius.

The Catholic Church regards Jacob of Serugh as a Saint. He is recorded as such on 29 November in the latest edition of the Roman Martyrology, that of 2004 (p. 649).

Works
He is especially famous for his metrical homilies in the dodecasyllabic verse of which, says Bar Hebraeus, he composed over eight hundred known to us. Only a selection of them have been published in modern translations, e.g. on Simeon Stylites, on virginity, fornication, etc., two on Virgin St. Mary, mother of Jesus, on the chariot described by Ezekiel, and in the ongoing series of texts with English translations being published by Gorgias Press in the series, which has also republished the five-volume publication of homilies by P. Bedjan with a supplemental sixth volume of additional homilies collected by S. Brock. He wrote his earliest homilies in his early twenties.

Works in modern translation
 Memre concerning Mary, mother of Jesus —  Also — 
 Seven memre against the Jews, of which the sixth takes the form of a dispute ( sāḡiṯâ) between personifications of the Synagogue and the Church — 
 Memre on the dominical feasts — 
 Four memre on creation — 
 Memra on creation - 
 Memra on women whom Jesus met - 
 Memra on the Veil of Moses — 
 Memra on Ephrem the Syrian — 
 Memra on Simeon Stylites — 
 Prose homilies (turgame) — 
 Memre on Thomas the Apostle — 
 Memra on Melchizedek — 
 Letters —

See also 

Oriental Orthodoxy
Eastern Christianity

References

Relevant literature
 
 A Homily of Mar Jacob of Serûgh on the Reception of the Holy Mysteries by Dom Hugh Connolly, OSB 

 
 Schwartz, Daniel L. 2016. Discourses of Religious Violence and Christian Charity: The Christianization of Syria in Jacob of Sarug's On the Fall of the Idols. In Motions of Late Antiquity: Essays on Religion, Politics, and Society in Honour of Peter Brown, edited by Jamie Kreiner and Helmut Reimitz, 129–49. Turnhout, Belgium: Brepols.
 Butts, Aaron Michael. 2016. The Christian Arabic transmission of Jacob of Serugh (D. 521): The Sammlungen. Journal of the Canadian Society for Syriac Studies 16:39-59.
 Müller-Kessler, Christa. 2020. Jacob of Serugh's Homily on the Presentation in the Temple in an Early Syriac Palimpsest (BL, Add 17.137, no. 2). ARAM 32:9–16.

Syriac writers
Syriac Orthodox Church bishops
450s births
521 deaths
6th-century Byzantine people